The 2015 Milo Asian Junior and Cadet Table Tennis Championships were held in Kuala Lumpur, Malaysia, from  22 to 26 July 2015. It was organised by the Table Tennis Association of Malaysia under the authority of the Asian Table Tennis Union (ATTU).

Medal summary

Events

Medal table

See also

2015 World Junior Table Tennis Championships
Asian Table Tennis Championships
Asian Table Tennis Union

References

Asian Junior and Cadet Table Tennis Championships
Asian Junior and Cadet Table Tennis Championships
Asian Junior and Cadet Table Tennis Championships
Asian Junior and Cadet Table Tennis Championships
Table tennis competitions in Malaysia
International sports competitions hosted by Malaysia
Asian Junior and Cadet Table Tennis Championships